Silvi Vrait (28 April 1951 – 28 June 2013) was an Estonian singer and music teacher.

Biography
Vrait was born in Kehra in 1951 to Einar "Edward" Wright, a Minnesota-born American of Finnish ancestry and his Estonian wife Senta (née Schönberg). She had a half-sister, Pille, five years her senior.

Vrait graduated from the Kehra Music School in 1968 on piano. In 1974 she graduated from the University of Tartu with a degree in English philology. From 1994, she taught English in a secondary school in Tallinn. Vrait coached vocalists, Evelin Samuel and Kaire Vilgats among many at the Georg Ots Music School in Tallinn.

Stage career
Silvi Vrait first appeared on stage in 1972 when she performed in a TV show. She was a member of several pop and rock musical ensembles, including  Viker 5, Suuk, Initsiaal and in 1975, she joined the popular band Fix. From 1976 to 1983 she was active in theatre Vanemuine in Tartu. Her style varies from jazz to country and from rock to folk. In the late 1980s, she was an important figure within the Estonian armless struggle for restoring the independence, the Singing Revolution, for at least two recordings, "Väikene rahvas, väikene maa" ("Small Nation, Tiny Country") and "Ei ole üksi ükski maa" ("No Land Is Alone").

She appeared in musicals and operas, such as "Põhjaneitsi" ("The Maid of the North") (title role, 1980), Porgy and Bess (Bess, 1985), The King and I (Lady Thiang, 1998), Zorba (Leader, 2000), Gypsy (Mama Rose, 2001), Chicago (Mama Morton, 2004) and The Sound of Music (Mother Abbess, 2003, reprised in 2010), Cabaret (Fräulein Schneider, 2012).

In 1994, Vrait was the representative of Estonia at the Eurovision Song Contest, held in Dublin that year. Her song "Nagu merelaine" ended up on 24th out of 25 places, beating only Lithuania.

Death

In 2013 Vrait was hospitalized with a brain tumour and died on 28 June 2013, aged 62. She was buried at Tallinn's  Forest Cemetery. Vrait is survived by her son, Silver Vrait.

References

External links

1951 births
2013 deaths
20th-century Estonian women singers
Estonian pop singers
Eurovision Song Contest entrants of 1994
Eurovision Song Contest entrants for Estonia
Estonian musical theatre actresses
Estonian people of Finnish descent
Estonian people of American descent
Estonian music educators
People from Kehra
Singers from Tallinn
Deaths from brain tumor
Deaths from cancer in Estonia
Burials at Metsakalmistu
University of Tartu alumni
20th-century Estonian actresses
21st-century Estonian actresses
Women music educators
Recipients of the Order of the White Star, 5th Class
Teachers of English as a second or foreign language
21st-century Estonian women singers